GLV and BCV are television stations licensed to serve Traralgon and Bendigo and regional Victoria, Australia. The stations are owned and operated by Southern Cross 10.

History

Early years
GLV-10 in Traralgon was the first regional television station to launch in Australia, on 9 December 1961, originally covering the Gippsland and Latrobe Valley areas. It was also the first station to use entirely Australian-made broadcasting equipment from Amalgamated Wireless Australasia. The original transmission equipment consisted of a 10 kW and 2 kW transmitter (standby) which was based on the RCA product and adapted to 230 V 50 Hz by AWA. The Melbourne pickup was a Rhode and Schwarz off air receiver with AWA return microwave links to the Studio. BCV-8 first went to air two weeks later, on 23 December 1961 (the same day as the launch of GMV-6 Shepparton), serving Bendigo and Central Victoria.

Affiliations
GLV pioneered the use of live, 'off-air' relays of television programs from stations in Melbourne, including GTV-9's hugely popular In Melbourne Tonight. Since the station had no video recording equipment, engineers were forced to rely on picking up the original signal at the transmitter site to relay back to the studio. As the sole commercial television station in the region, GLV's program lineup included local output such as news and children's programs, combined with programs selected from Melbourne's commercial stations - the Nine Network (GTV-9), Seven Network (HSV-7), and from 1964, Network Ten (ATV-0).

An affiliation was formed between the two stations and STV-8 Mildura in the 1970s as the Victorian Broadcasting Network, adopting the name of a former statewide radio network and later as  Television Centre of Victoria. In 1982, the three stations merged as the Southern Cross TV8 television network, sharing a common stylised flag logo and programming schedule.  The name changed to the Southern Cross Network seven years later. STV-8 was split from the network in 1990 when the station joined the then-Television Victoria network as Mildura was not included in the Victorian aggregation plan.

From GLV-10 to GLV-8
On 17 January 1980, GLV-10 changed frequency from VHF channel 10 to 8, to allow neighbouring Melbourne television station ATV-0 to move to the channel 10 frequency three days later to eliminate interference problems on VHF-0. Channels 8 and 10 became simply Channel 8 as a result of the switch.

Aggregation
When aggregation in regional Victoria took place between 1992 and 1993, the Southern Cross Network expanded to Shepparton, Ballarat and Albury as an affiliate of Network 10. By September 1993, the network had changed its name and logo to SCN TV, and then again in May 1994 to Ten Victoria. This latest change coincided with the axing of the station's local news service (SCN TV News at Six), replaced by ATV-10's Ten News at 5.

21st century developments
On 30 November 2000, GLV-8 moved again to UHF channel 37, in order to allow another Melbourne station, this time GTV-9 to commence digital television transmissions on Channel 8 without interference. The two stations' playout and management operations were moved from Bendigo to Canberra in September 2005.

On 1 July 2016, Southern Cross switched its primary affiliation from Network Ten to the Nine Network in Queensland, Southern NSW, ACT, South Australia and Victoria. The Southern Cross Ten branding was retired and replaced by generic Nine branding.

On 1 July 2021, Southern Cross switched back to on air programs from the Nine Network to Network 10 and it airs programs from ATV-10, Melbourne.

Programming

News and Current Affairs
GLV/BCV broadcasts 10 News First with Jennifer Keyte from ATV-10.

History 
From their inception, regional stations GLV and BCV provided local news bulletins within their respective markets. This was usually supplemented by a relay of one of the Melbourne-based bulletins.

During the 1980s, GLV/BCV branded their evening news block as TV8 NewsHour, comprising half an hour of locally based news and half an hour of news from Melbourne channel HSV-7.  In April 1987, the Melbourne-based news became sourced from GTV-9 as HSV-7 had changed its news format to a one-hour bulletin.

In 1986, TV8 NewsHour won a Logie award for Most Outstanding Contribution by a Regional Television Station.

In 1991, GLV/BCV changed its Melbourne-based news relay to Ten Eyewitness News from ATV-10, in the lead-up to the aggregation of regional markets which would see GLV/BCV align with the Ten Network for program material.

In January 1992, following aggregation, GLV/BCV maintained its local half-hour news in its traditional markets of Gippsland and Bendigo.  (Alternative general entertainment programming was broadcast in this timeslot in the newer markets of Shepparton, Ballarat and Albury) This bulletin was supplemented by a half-hour edition of Southern Cross Eyewitness News, anchored by Rob Gaylard and broadcast across the expanded market covered by GLV/BCV, presenting 'national' news of relevance to the broader market.

Southern Cross Eyewitness News was soon disbanded, instead having the Gippsland and Bendigo local news services at 6:00 pm supplemented by the Melbourne-based Ten Eyewitness News, from ATV-10, which aired weeknights at 5:00 pm.

In September 1993, Southern Cross Network became SCN.  The news programming block was changed again.  Relay of the Melbourne-based Ten Eyewitness News was dropped, with the Bendigo edition of local news - SCN News at Six - expanded to cover the local markets of Shepparton and Ballarat.  The Gippsland-based edition of SCN News at Six continued to cover that local region only.  At 6:30 pm, GLV/BCV re-instated the statewide Eyewitness News half-hour bulletin for broadcast across the Gippsland, Bendigo, Shepparton and Ballarat markets.  The Albury/Upper Murray local market instead received a delayed broadcast of the Sydney-based Ten Eyewitness News bulletin in the 6:00 pm hour as an alternative to Melbourne-based bulletins being broadcast on rival channels VIC TV and Prime Television.

In May 1994, SCN was re-branded Ten Victoria.  The local news bulletins of GLV/BCV were axed, as was the now renamed statewide SCN News at 6.  News coverage was now a straight relay of the Melbourne edition of Ten News from ATV-10 with no local or state-based news bulletins (on weekdays) and the national weekend report from TEN-10 from Sydney during weekends, as well as, till 2014, the Network Ten national morning and late night news bulletins.

Local news was reintroduced to the station in 2004 in the form of three-minute updates at various times of the day. The Updates are produced by Southern Cross News from its CTC studios in Canberra. As Southern Cross Ten Local News, the updates are pre-recorded. Between 21 March 2011 and 19 June 2015, viewers in Shepparton and the Goulburn Valley received a trial regional news magazine program called Weeknights at 6:30pm on weekdays. The Project then aired in full in its place for the remainder of its Ten affiliation.

Given its 1 July 2016 affiliate switch to the Nine Network, the news updates had been upgraded to full bulletin relaunch as Nine Local News by March 2017. The new SC9 served as the Nine News regional broadcaster to regional Victoria viewers, with the state and local level news provided by GTV-9 in Melbourne.

As of 1 July 2021, Southern Cross uses the ATV-10 News with Jennifer Keyte from Melbourne at 5:00pm and ''The Project' at 6:30pm on Weekdays and Sundays. From 1 August 2021, Sky News Australia has been offered in the viewing areas of Regional Victoria.

Main Transmitters
The following transmitters use the GLV call sign:

The following transmitters use the BCV call sign:

Notes:
 1. HAAT estimated from http://www.itu.int/SRTM3/ using EHAAT.
 2. The Latrobe Valley station was on VHF channel 10 from its 1961 sign-on until 1980, moving to VHF channel 8 in order to accommodate 10 Melbourne's switch from VHF channel 0 to channel 10. It moved to its current channel in November 2000 (it began on 4 September 2000) in order to accommodate Nine Melbourne's digital television signal in Melbourne.
 3. The Bendigo station also broadcasts on analogue (UHF) channel 38 with 1200 kW ERP at 508 m HAAT from 30 November 2000 as a countermeasure against interference with Nine Melbourne's digital signal, also on VHF channel 8.
 4. The Swan Hill station initially broadcast on VHF channel 11 as the relay of BCV-8 Bendigo from sign-on in 1967 until the early 1990s when it changed to VHF channel 10, to allow ABRV to move from VHF channel 3 to VHF channel 11.
 5. Analogue transmissions ceased as of 5 May 2011 as part of the conversion to digital television.

References

See also
 Regional television in Australia
 Southern Cross Ten

Southern Cross Media Group
Television channels and stations established in 1961
1961 establishments in Australia